David Cameron's term as the Prime Minister of the United Kingdom began on 11 May 2010, when he accepted an invitation of Queen Elizabeth II to form a government, succeeding Gordon Brown of the Labour Party, and ended on 13 July 2016 upon his resignation following the 2016 referendum that favoured Brexit, which he had opposed. While serving as prime minister, Cameron also served as the first lord of the treasury, minister for the civil service and leader of the Conservative Party.

Following the 2010 general election, Cameron became prime minister at the head of a coalition government between the Conservatives and the Liberal Democrats, as no party had gained an overall majority in the House of Commons for the first time since the February 1974 general election. One of the first decisions he made as prime minister was the appointment of Nick Clegg, the leader of the Liberal Democrats, as deputy prime minister. Between them, the Conservatives and Liberal Democrats controlled 363 seats in the House of Commons, with a majority of 76 seats. Following the 2015 general election, Cameron was re-elected as prime minister, but this time at the head of a Conservative majority government with a parliamentary majority of 12 seats.

Cameron's premiership was marked by the ongoing effects of the late-2000s financial crisis; these involved a large deficit in government finances that his government sought to reduce through austerity measures. His administration passed the Health and Social Care Act and the Welfare Reform Act, which introduced large-scale changes to healthcare and welfare. It also enforced stricter immigration policies, introduced reforms to education and oversaw the 2012 London Olympics. It privatised the Royal Mail and some other state assets, and legalised same-sex marriage in England and Wales.

Internationally, Cameron's government intervened militarily in the First Libyan Civil War and authorised the bombing of the Islamic State. Domestically, his government oversaw the referendum on voting reform and Scottish independence referendum, both of which confirmed Cameron's favoured outcome. When the Conservatives secured an unexpected majority in the 2015 general election, he remained as prime minister, this time leading a Conservative-only government. To fulfil a manifesto pledge, he introduced a referendum on the UK's continuing membership of the EU. Cameron supported continued membership; following the success of the Leave vote, he resigned as prime minister and was succeeded by his Home Secretary Theresa May.

First term (2010–2015)

At the 2010 general election on 6 May, the Conservative Party achieved its highest number of seats since the 1992 election, returning 306 MPs. However, it was still 20 seats short of an overall majority, resulting in the nation's first hung parliament since February 1974. Talks between Cameron and Liberal Democrat leader Clegg led to a coalition of the two parties, enabling the Queen to invite Cameron to form a government and become Prime Minister, ending 13 years of Labour rule over the United Kingdom government.

Entering government

Cameron and his wife Samantha Cameron were driven from Buckingham Palace, arriving at Downing Street on 11 May. Cameron paid tribute to the outgoing Labour government and his predecessor Gordon Brown. He went on to describe the "difficult decisions" to reach "better times ahead". Cameron met with his party's MPs on 11 May, whose cheers of jubilation were heard from the central hall of the Commons. It is likely that he then explained the details of any coalition agreements made between the Conservatives and the Liberal Democrats.

Cameron made his first official visits as prime minister in May. He first visited Scotland and met with the First Minister Alex Salmond, followed by Wales to meet with the First Minister Carwyn Jones, and Northern Ireland to meet with the First Minister Peter Robinson. His first trip to a foreign country was on 20 May to France where he met with the French President Nicolas Sarkozy. He visited Germany on 21 May where he held talks with Chancellor Angela Merkel.

Cabinet appointments

A press conference on the new cabinet took place on 12 May 2010. Soon after Cameron took office, it was confirmed that the Clegg, would be appointed to the semi-official role of deputy prime minister, while George Osborne would become the Chancellor of the Exchequer. Later it was confirmed that William Hague had assumed the post of foreign secretary and the new home secretary would be Theresa May. Cameron's cabinet included Clegg and four other Liberal Democrats: Danny Alexander, Vince Cable, Chris Huhne, and David Laws.

Policies

Economic issues and programme for austerity

The economy was a priority in the continuing wake of late-2000s financial crisis and the consequent increasing government debt when Cameron came into office, with the topic being of much concern in British public opinion. The government announced a policy, later called 'Plan A', of eliminating the structural deficit and ensuring that the debt-to-GDP ratio started falling by the end of the parliament in 2015. To facilitate this goal, the Office for Budget Responsibility and a government-wide spending review were created. While several government agencies enacted spending decreases, funding policies for the National Health Service and for overseas development were exempt.

In 2010, the Behavioural Insights Team was set up to apply nudge theory (behavioural economics and psychology) to try to improve government policy and services as well as to save the UK government money.

In February 2013, the UK lost its AAA credit rating, the retention of which the government had indicated to be a priority when coming to power, for the first time since 1978. By 2015 the annual deficit had been cut by about half, (the initial target was to get it to zero), so the debt-to-GDP ratio was still rising.

Specifically, Cameron's first term in office, enacting changes from 2010 to 2014, involved about £100 billion of cuts in government expenditures. In terms of economic growth, the figures that came in were generally below expectations at first, but nationwide growth picked up to an annual rate of 3% by the end of 2014, indicating a mixed picture as many of the new job positions being created have featured relatively low wages. Cameron's administration has also pursued a policy of tax increases; however, the bulk of the deficit reduction that occurred, more than 80% of the total, was related to spending cuts.

In 2014, Cameron stated that the austerity programme would continue into the next parliament with further cuts to be decided after the election.

Cameron's government introduced a law to prevent raising Income Tax, National Insurance and VAT rates. Ameet Gill, aide to Cameron at the time claims this was "poorly thought out", done "on the hoof" and "probably the dumbest economic policy". Labour considered the policy unwise and claimed it would make ending the spending deficit harder. Conservatives claimed they were leaving people with more of their own money to spend.

Reforms to the benefits system
In 2010 a white paper was introduced by Iain Duncan Smith to reform the benefits system, merging six benefits into the Universal Credit. The objectives of the policy included creating a more responsive system that would simplify and incentive return to work, pay benefits in a monthly cycle more akin to salaries, reduce the high marginal deduction rate that accumulates from the withdrawal of more than one means-tested benefit simultaneously improving incentives, ensure that taking on even a small or varying amount of work would be financially rewarding, and reduce the proportion of children growing up in homes where no one worked. Universal Credit would merge out-of-work benefits and in-work support to improve return to work incentives.  Implementation proved to be difficult and was much delayed, with the first roll out of the full system in December 2018, with full implementation targeted for 2024.

In 2015 the Chancellor, George Osborne, announced a future £3.2 billion a year cut to the Universal Credit budget, to significant criticism about risks the system would fail to achieve its purpose of incentivising work in low-income households.

Reforms to the National Health Service

The Health and Social Care Bill was the most deep-rooted and extensive reworking of the structure of the National Health Service ever undertaken. The bill had implications for all health organizations in the NHS, not least for primary care trusts (PCTs) and strategic health authorities (SHAs), which were replaced by clinical commissioning groups principally run by local GPs.

The bill was one of the government's most controversial proposals, and in April 2011 the government announced a "listening exercise" postponing further action on the bill. The controversy arose in part because the proposals were not discussed during the 2010 general election campaign and were not contained in the May 2010 Conservative–Liberal Democrat coalition agreement. Two months after the election, a white paper outlined what The Daily Telegraph called the "biggest revolution in the NHS since its foundation".

Arms sales
During the throes of the Arab Spring, for which he had voiced support, Cameron spent three days touring undemocratic Gulf states with eight of Britain's leading defence manufacturers. In response to the ensuing criticism, Cameron issued a three-point defence. Early in 2012, Cameron again visited the Middle East to "broaden and deepen" business ties with Saudi Arabia – Britain's leading arms export market – even after Amnesty International had several weeks earlier accused the Saudi government of unleashing a wave of repression against the repressed minority-Shia population in the east of the country, and even as Saudi troops added to the list of Shia protesters they had shot dead. The week before his Saudi visit, the Committees on Arms Export Controls published questions it had asked the Coalition regarding arms sales to Saudi Arabia, in particular querying why, when there was unrest in the country in 2011, licences for a range of equipment had not been revoked.

In 2014, after Israel's Operation Protective Edge, Cameron's government came under pressure to place an arms embargo on Israel. Vince Cable, whose department was ultimately responsible for such matters, issued a threat to suspend 12 export licences if violence escalated again. The threat was dismissed in Israel, and was described by one leading Israeli journalist as simply "an attempt at gesture politics to local voters".

NATO military intervention in Libya

Libya–United Kingdom relations soured in 2011 with the outbreak of the Libyan Civil War. Cameron condemned the "appalling and unacceptable" violence used against anti-Gaddafi protesters. After weeks of lobbying by the UK and its allies, on 17 March 2011 the United Nations Security Council approved a no-fly zone to prevent government forces loyal to Muammar Gaddafi from carrying out air attacks on anti-Gaddafi rebels. Two days later the UK and the United States fired more than 110 Tomahawk missiles at targets in Libya.

Cameron has said he is "proud" of the role United Kingdom played in the overthrow of Gaddafi's government. Cameron also stated that UK had played a "very important role", adding that "a lot of people said that Tripoli was completely different to Benghazi and that the two don't get on—they were wrong. ... People who said 'this is all going to be an enormous swamp of Islamists and extremists'—they were wrong."

In March 2016, with two main rival factions based in Tripoli and Benghazi continuing to fight, an Independent editorial noted that "there can be no question that Libya is broken. There are three nominal governments, none of which holds much authority. The economy is flatlining. Refugees flood to the Mediterranean. And Isis has put down roots in Sirte and, increasingly, Tripoli." It was at this time that US President Barack Obama accused Cameron of allowing Libya to sink into a "mess", though in private the American leader bluntly describes post-intervention Libya as a "shit show".

In 2015 through 2016, the Foreign Affairs Select Committee conducted an extensive and highly critical inquiry into the British involvement in the civil war. It concluded that the early threat to civilians had been overstated and that the significant Islamist element in the rebel forces had not been recognised, due to an intelligence failure. By summer 2011 the initial limited intervention to protect Libyan civilians had become a policy of regime change. However that new policy did not include proper support and for a new government, leading to a political and economic collapse in Libya and the growth of ISIL in North Africa. It concluded that Cameron was ultimately responsible for this British policy failure.

Syria and the Middle East

The government was critical of Bashar al-Assad's government in the 2011 Syrian uprisings stating it had "forfeited the right to lead" by "miring itself in the blood of innocent people", and backed the rebels. On 24 February 2012, the government recognised the Syrian National Council as a "legitimate representative" of the country. On 20 November 2012, the National Coalition of Syrian Revolutionary and Opposition Forces was recognised as the "sole legitimate representative" of the Syrian people, and a credible alternative to the Syrian government.

On 21 August 2013, immediately following a chemical-weapons attack at Ghouta, Cameron urged U.S. President Barack Obama to respond with a military intervention. However a motion to participate in military strikes against the Syrian government was defeated in parliament on 29 August 2013. This was the first time that a British government was blocked from taking a military action by parliament. After the vote Cameron said that he "strongly [believed] in the need for a tough response to the use of chemical weapons but I also believe in respecting the will of this House of Commons ... It is clear to me that the British Parliament, reflecting the views of the British people, does not want to see British military action. I get that and the Government will act accordingly."

Ultimately a negotiated agreement was reached to eliminate Syria's chemical weapons.

Referendum on Scottish independence

A victory by the Scottish National Party in the 2011 Scottish general election raised the prospect of the Scottish Government holding an independence referendum within the following five years. Though the constitution is reserved to Westminster, the SNP planned to get round that by holding a referendum to seek a mandate to negotiate for independence. The UK government agreed to this plan. In October 2012 Cameron said that the campaign to keep Scotland within the United Kingdom was a priority for the government.

Delayed payment of EU dues
In November 2014, Cameron stated that the UK would not pay its EU dues. George Osborne later claimed victory on the dispute, noting that the UK wouldn't have to pay additional interest on the payments, which would be delayed until after Britain's 7 May 2015 general election.

Transport

Following the 2010 general election, the new Conservative-led Coalition continued Labour's policies on rail transport largely unaltered after a pause to review the finances, keeping the privatised system in place. There was continuing support for the High Speed 2 scheme and further developing plans for the route. Whilst initially showing scepticism towards the electrification of the Great Western route, they later gave the project its backing and work began formally in 2012. Crossrail and the upgrade to Thameslink are due for opening in 2018.

The Government has moved towards allowing more competition on the intercity network through open access operators. In 2015 it approved a service run by Alliance Rail to operate between London and Blackpool, and both Alliance and FirstGroup have applied to run open access services on the East Coast Main Line.

In January 2015, Cameron said "We've made sure that rail fares cannot go up by more than inflation. So the rail fare increase this year, as last year, is linked to inflation, and I think that's right. In previous years it's gone up by more than inflation. But, of course, what you're seeing on our railways is a £38bn investment project. And that money is coming, of course, from taxpayers, from the government, and from farepayers as well." He said Britain was seeing "the biggest investment in our roads since the 1970s, but in our railways since Victorian times".

Food banks
The rapid growth in the use of food banks under David Cameron became one of the major criticisms of his administration, and a recurring theme at Prime Minister's Questions. Cameron praised volunteers providing donated food as "part of what I call the Big Society", to which Labour leader Ed Miliband responded that he "never thought the Big Society was about feeding hungry children in Britain".

In February 2014, 27 Anglican bishops together with leading Methodists and Quakers wrote an open letter to Cameron blaming government policy for a rise in the use of food banks. The letter asserted that "over half of people using food banks have been put in that situation by cutbacks to and failures in the benefit system, whether it be payment delays or punitive sanctions". The government responded that delays in benefit processing had been reduced, with the proportion of benefits paid on time rising from 88 to 89% under Labour, to 96–97% in 2014. Cameron said that the rise in food bank usage was due to the government encouraging Jobcentres and local authorities to promote them, and noted an OECD report which showed a fall in the proportion of people in Britain struggling to buy food.

Scandals
 In November 2011, Home Secretary Theresa May came under heavy criticism for presiding over a scheme weakening UK border controls, and allowing potential terrorists into the country unchecked. Some of the blame also fell on (now former) Head of the UK border force Brodie Clark, whom May claimed went beyond his remit.
 Lib Dem Business Secretary Vince Cable was removed from a quasi-judicial role in deciding whether BSkyB should be allowed to takeover control of Sky, after being accused of bias against News Corporation, the company which owns BSkyB.

News of the World phone hacking scandal

Cameron's close relationship with senior figures of News International came under increasing scrutiny as the controversy of the News of the World phone hacking scandal grew. A close friend of Rebekah Brooks, Cameron had also hired Andy Coulson as his communications director before Coulson was implicated in, and later arrested for his role in, the phone hacking. Cameron, who had spent his Christmas with Brooks, was accused by Ed Miliband of being "out of step with public opinion" and lacking leadership on the matter due to his "close relationships" with News International. The scandal was further aggravated by the announcement he had ridden Rebekah Brooks horse on loan from the Metropolitan Police, and the implicit involvement of Culture Secretary Jeremy Hunt, whom had been handed jurisdiction over Rupert Murdoch's BSkyB bid following Vince Cable's supposed expression of bias, in passing confidential information to the Murdoch empire regarding the bid's progress
Right-leaning political commentator Peter Oborne argued that it was no longer possible to assert that Cameron was "grounded with a decent set of values" after a "succession of chronic personal misjudgements", equating the scandal with Tony Blair's decision to go to war in Iraq as a turning point in his premiership, and calling for him to distance himself from Brooks.

Effect of the Coalition on Cameron's Premiership
The Prime Ministerial Thesis of Government suggests that there is too much power given to the prime minister. Due to the unwritten constitution of the UK, there is little constraint on the power of the prime minister. However, during the 2010-2015 coalition, this theory was tested as it showed that there are limits to the power of the Prime Minister. As a result of the coalition, Cameron used half of his cabinet slots to make room for Clegg as his deputy prime minister, and other Liberal Democrats as ministers. In which they suggest that Cameron's power as prime minister was severely limited during the coalition:

Bennister and Heffernan argue that Cameron's leadership style differs to that of Thatcher and Blair, as a result of the coalition. Thatcher and Blair both presented a presidential style of leadership during their premierships (presidentialism.) Cameron was not able to demonstrate this type of power, as he often 'accepted the veto' that was presented to him by the Liberal Democrats. He was often restrained by the fact he continually had to compromise with a party that was ideologically set to the left of his own. Anthony Seldon and Mike Finn support the argument that the coalition severely effect Cameron's power as Prime Minister as they suggest that "The lack of an overall Conservative majority in Parliament and the requirement to work with the Liberal Democrats were constraints that no post-war Prime Minister of any party has had to face for any extended duration." Seldon and Finn reflect on what Cameron could have achieved had he not been in a coalition; "He would have had more freedom of manoeuvre on Europe. He would have gone further on welfare reform and on spending cuts. He would have insisted on more value for money from the green agenda, and pushed the 'Big Society' agenda harder. He would have focused less on civil liberties and more on the need for tough national security. Above all, the boundary changes would almost certainly have been implemented."

Second term (2015–2016)

Appointments

Following the 2015 general election, Cameron remained prime minister, this time at the head of a Conservative-only government with a majority of 12 seats. Having gained seats from Labour and the Liberal Democrats, Cameron was able to form a government without a coalition partner, resulting in the first Conservative-only cabinet since 1997.

2015 Summer Budget
Following the election victory Chancellor George Osborne announced that there would be a second 2015 budget on 8 July. The main announcements included:
A "National Living Wage" for those over 25, of £9/hour by 2020
The tax-free personal allowance for Income Tax was raised to £11,000 from £10,600
Defence spending was protected at 2% of GDP for the duration of the Parliament
Welfare reform, including lowering the benefits cap to £20,000 for those outside London and limiting child tax credit to the first two children
An increase in the inheritance tax threshold, meaning that a married couple will be able to pass on £1 million tax-free
A reduction in the amount individuals earning over £150,000 could pay into their pension tax-free
An increase in free childcare from 15 hours/week to 30 hours/week for working families with 3- and 4-year-olds
An £800 increase in the amount of maintenance loan paid out to poorer students, paid for by replacing maintenance grants with loans
Measures to introduce tax incentives for large corporations to create apprenticeships, aiming for 3 million new apprenticeships by 2020.

Syria and counter terrorism
In response to the November 2015 Paris attacks, Cameron secured the support of the House of Commons to extend air strikes against ISIS into Syria. Earlier that year, Cameron had outlined a five-year strategy to counter Islamist extremism and subversive teachings.

Criticism of use of statutory instruments
In January 2016, The Independent reported that there had been an increase of over 50% in the use of statutory instruments, used to pass legislation without Parliamentary scrutiny since 2010. Lord Jopling deplored the behaviour which he called an abuse whilst The Baroness Smith of Basildon asked whether it was the start of "constitutional gerrymandering".

Referendum on the European Union and resignation

In his 2015 election manifesto, David Cameron pledged to hold a referendum on Britain's membership of the European Union sometime before 2017 at the latest. Following extensive negotiations between Cameron and other European leaders, the referendum took place on 23 June 2016. The British electorate voted by 52% to 48% in favour of leaving the European Union, an objective which had become known as Brexit.

On 24 June, a few hours after the results became known, Cameron announced that he would resign from the office of prime minister by the start of the Conservative Party Conference in October 2016. In a farewell speech outside 10 Downing Street, he stated that, on account of his own advocacy on behalf of remaining in the EU, "I do not think it would be right for me to try to be the captain that steers our country to its next destination." His resignation came despite 82 MPs having signed a letter in favour of Cameron remaining prime minister before the referendum.

His resignation was originally not to be made official until October at the party conference, leaving Cameron in charge until then whilst a leadership election took place within the Conservative Party. However, following the withdrawal of the only remaining candidate, Andrea Leadsom, Theresa May was left unopposed, annulling the leadership contest. Cameron subsequently resigned with May's premiership taking effect Wednesday 13 July 2016.

Legacy

Domestic policy

Brexit

David Cameron called the 2016 United Kingdom European Union membership referendum, which resulted in the UK voting to leave the European Union. In response, his successor as prime minister, Theresa May, had triggered the Article 50 of the Lisbon Treaty in March 2017, paving way for the UK to leave the European Union on 31 January 2020.

Policy shifts in the Conservative Party
As he became the leader, David Cameron promised a brand of "modern compassionate Conservatism" for the Conservative Party. He embarked on a "hug a husky" trip to highlight the impact of climate change and consistently underlined the NHS as his priority. Under Cameron, the selection panels were banned from asking would-be-MPs about their sexuality.

In government, Cameron introduced a number of policies which was traditionally opposed by the Conservative party, including:

The legalisation marriage in England and Wales via the Marriage (Same Sex Couples) Act 2013;
 Enshrining into law a commitment to spend 0.7% of the GDP on overseas aid;
 Introducing the National Living Wage.

Electorally, Cameron led the Conservatives to become the largest party in the 2010 general election and won an outright majority in 2015 general election.

Economic growth
The UK economy grew from $2.4 trillion in 2010 to $2.8 trillion in 2015. Unemployment fell from 2.51 million in 2010 to 1.67 million in 2016.

However, Cameron also presided over a fall in living standards from 2010 to 2014, the longest for 50 years. Meanwhile, the average house price rose from £170,846 to £209,054, pricing many people out of home ownership and into the often expensive private rental sector.

Deficit reduction
The UK government deficit decreased from £154.8bn in 2010 to £74.9bn in 2016.

Entitlement reform
Cameron's government introduced a "benefit cap", limiting the amount of benefits a working-age person can receive. The under-occupancy penalty was also introduced, which reduces the housing benefit paid to a public-housing tenant with rooms deemed to be "spare". On the other hand, the government's "triple lock" policy guarantees that the state pension would increase by the rate of inflation, average earning growth or 2.5%, whichever is the greatest.

NHS
In 2010, 95% of patients in the Accident and Emergency departments spent less than four hours waiting and be treated. Despite the government's official target being 95%, the figure dropped below 90% by 2016. The waiting time target was missed for every month from July 2015 until Cameron's resignation.

Olympics
Cameron's government presided over the delivery of the 2012 Summer Olympics, the hosting right of which was won under the premiership of Tony Blair. The game brought over 3 million visitors to the UK. as well as the regeneration of east London.

Hillsborough Inquest and Bloody Sunday Inquiry
The Hillsborough Inquest and the Bloody Sunday Inquiry were both published during Cameron's administration. In both cases, Cameron made a full apology to the victims on behalf of the British Government.

Scottish referendum on independence
Following a Scottish National Party victory in the 2011 Scottish Parliament election, Cameron had agreed to a transfer of power facilitating the 2014 Scottish independence referendum. Cameron had advocated Scotland to remain as part of the United Kingdom, offering a package of further devolution of powers to the Scottish government. Although Scotland did vote to remain as part of the UK, the Scottish National Party went on to win 56 out of the 59 Scottish seats in the 2015 general election. The independence question also returned after the UK voted to leave the EU, with the Scottish parliament voting to hold a second independence referendum between Autumn 2018 and Spring 2019, although the UK government did not.

Public outcry over Resignation honours
In a controversial use of the honour system, Cameron included a large number of his political allies in the 2016 Prime Minister's Resignation Honours. The move has sparked calls for a reform on the honours system.

Foreign policy

Libya
Cameron was heavily involved in the 2011 military intervention in Libya. However, the handling of the intervention's aftermath was sharply criticised by the Foreign Affairs Committee inquiry into Libya. Barack Obama reportedly said that Cameron was "distracted" after the Libyan government under Gaddafi fell.

International prime ministerial trips 

Cameron made 148 trips to 62 countries (in addition to visiting the Occupied Palestinian Territories) during his premiership.

The number of visits per country:

 One visit to Algeria, Austria, Brazil, Bulgaria, Denmark, Egypt, Finland, Grenada, Hungary, Iceland, Ireland, Israel, Jamaica, Kazakhstan, Kuwait, Lebanon, Liberia, Lithuania, Luxembourg, Mexico, Myanmar, Nigeria, Norway, Oman, Qatar, Romania, Slovakia, Slovenia, South Korea, Sri Lanka and Vietnam.
 Two visits to Australia, Canada, China, Indonesia, Japan, Jordan, Latvia, Libya, Malaysia, Malta, Pakistan, Portugal, Singapore, South Africa, Spain and Sweden.
 Three visits to the Czech Republic, India, the Netherlands, Russia, Saudi Arabia, Turkey and the United Arab Emirates.
 Five visits to Italy and Poland.
 Six visits to Switzerland.
 Nine visits to Afghanistan.
 Ten visits to the United States.
 Twelve visits to Germany.
 Eighteen visits to France.
 Fifty visits to Belgium.

See also

2010s in United Kingdom political history
Anti-austerity movement
 Politics of the United Kingdom

References

Further reading
 Ashcroft, Michael, and Isabel Oakeshott. Call Me Dave: The Unauthorised Biography of David Cameron (2016) excerpt
 Bale, Tim. "David Cameron, 2005–10." in Leaders of the Opposition (Palgrave Macmillan, London, 2012) pp. 222–236.
 Bennister, Mark, and Richard Heffernan. "Cameron as prime minister: The intra-executive politics of Britain's coalition government." Parliamentary Affairs 65.4 (2012): 778–801.
 Benoit, William L., and Jennifer M. Benoit-Bryan. "Debates come to the United Kingdom: A functional analysis of the 2010 British prime minister election debates." Communication Quarterly 61.4 (2013): 463–478.
 Byrne, Chris, Nick Randall, and Kevin Theakston. "Evaluating British prime ministerial performance: David Cameron’s premiership in political time." British Journal of Politics and International Relations 19.1 (2017): 202–220.online
 Carter, Neil, and Ben Clements. "From 'greenest government ever' to 'get rid of all the green crap': David Cameron, the Conservatives and the environment." British Politics 10.2 (2015): 204–225. online
 Daddow, Oliver, and Pauline Schnapper. "Liberal intervention in the foreign policy thinking of Tony Blair and David Cameron." Cambridge Review of International Affairs 26.2 (2013): 330–349. online
 Davis, Aeron, and Emily Seymour. "Generating forms of media capital inside and outside a field: the strange case of David Cameron in the UK political field." Media, Culture & Society 32.5 (2010): 739–759. online
 Dommett, Katharine. "The theory and practice of party modernisation: The conservative party under David Cameron, 2005–2015." British Politics 10.2 (2015): 249–266. online
 Erlanger, Steven, and Stephen Castle. "In 'Brexit' Vote, David Cameron Faces Problem of His Own Making" The New York Times June 21, 2016
 Evans, Stephen. "'Mother's Boy': David Cameron and Margaret Thatcher." British Journal of Politics and International Relations 12.3 (2010): 325–343. online
 Evans, Stephen. "Consigning its past to history? David Cameron and the Conservative Party." Parliamentary Affairs 61.2 (2008): 291–314.
 Gannon, Philip. "The bridge that Blair built: David Cameron and the transatlantic relationship." British Politics 9.2 (2014): 210–229.
 Garnett, Mark. "Built on sand? Ideology and Conservative modernisation under David Cameron." British Party Politics and Ideology after New Labour (Palgrave Macmillan, London, 2010) pp. 107–118.
 Green, Jane. "Strategic Recovery? The Conservatives Under David Cameron." Parliamentary Affairs 63.4 (2010): 667–688. online
 
 Hayton, Richard. "British conservatism after the vote for Brexit: The ideological legacy of David Cameron." British Journal of Politics and International Relations 20.1 (2018): 223–238. online
 , essays by experts.
 Heppell, Tim. "The conservative party leadership of David Cameron: Heresthetics and the realignment of British Politics." British Politics 8.3 (2013): 260–284. online
 
 Lunt, Peter. "The performance of power and citizenship: David Cameron meets the people." International Journal of Cultural Studies 22.5 (2019): 678–690. online
 Mölder, Holger. "British Approach to the European Union: From Tony Blair to David Cameron." in Brexit ed. by David Ramiro Troitiño et al. (Springer, Cham, 2018) pp. 153–173. online
 eymour, Richard. The Meaning of David Cameron (John Hunt Publishing, 2010).
 Smith, Julie. "Gambling on Europe: David Cameron and the 2016 referendum." British Politics  13.1 (2018): 1–16. online

External links
 David Cameron faces toughest hand of cards ever dealt a new prime minister, The Guardian, 11 May 2010
 Tory-Lib Dem coalition: Now for the difficult part, BBC News, 11 May 2010
 The coalition cabinet and ministerial appointments, PoliticsHome, 12 May 2010
 Can Pakistan stomach Cameron's WikiLeaks remarks? Radio France Internationale, 5 August 2010

Cameron, David
David Cameron
Nick Clegg
History of the Conservative Party (UK)
21st century in the United Kingdom
Articles containing video clips